PMCL may refer to

 Penetang-Midland Coach Lines
 Pakistan Mobile Communication Limited